Stromelysin-2 also known as matrix metalloproteinase-10 (MMP-10) or transin-2 is an enzyme that in humans is encoded by the MMP10 gene.

Function 

Proteins of the matrix metalloproteinase (MMP) family are involved in the breakdown of extracellular matrix in normal physiological processes, such as embryonic development, reproduction, and tissue remodeling, as well as in disease processes, such as arthritis and metastasis. Most MMPs are secreted as inactive proproteins which are activated when cleaved by extracellular proteinases. The enzyme encoded by this gene degrades proteoglycans and fibronectin. The gene is part of a cluster of MMP genes which localize to chromosome 11q22.3.

Clinical significance 

MMP10 has been linked to cancer stem cell vitality and metastasis.

MMP10 is a potential prognostic biomarker for oral cancer.

References

Further reading

External links 
 The MEROPS online database for peptidases and their inhibitors: M10.006
 

Matrix metalloproteinases
EC 3.4.24